Mikko Kurvinen (born March 11, 1979) is a Finnish professional ice hockey defenceman. He currently plays for HIFK of the Finnish Liiga.

Career statistics

References

External links

1979 births
Living people
Finnish ice hockey defencemen
FoPS players
HIFK (ice hockey) players
Kiekko-Vantaa players
Modo Hockey players
Mora IK players